Puu Huluhulu is a volcanic cone located near the center of the Island of Hawaii in the State of Hawaii. It is located on the southern side of Hawaii Route 200 (Daniel K. Inouye Highway, also known locally as Saddle Road), directly across from the highway's intersection with the Mauna Kea Access Road. Puu Huluhulu is Hawaiian for hairy hill (puu=hill and huluhulu=hairy).

The cone is a kīpuka, which is an older volcanic hill covered with vegetation, surrounded by the younger lava flow. The hill is located on Hawaii Route 200 and is a native tree sanctuary and a nature trail.

Beginning in July 2019, various groups opposed to the Thirty Meter Telescope gathered at Puu Huluhulu to block Mauna Kea Access Road and temporarily stop its construction, despite the Hawaii Supreme Court's ruling to allow construction to move forward.

Gallery

References

External links

Volcanoes of the Island of Hawaii
Parks in Hawaii